The Victoria 18 is an American trailerable sailboat that was designed by Canadian G. William McVay. It was built in the United States 1977 to 1983.

Most boats built were sloop rigged, but a few were built as cutters with a bowsprit. A small number were built as the Victoria 17, with a shorter hull and an outboard rudder.

The Victoria 18 is a cabin development of G. William McVay's 1967 open boat design, the Minuet.

Production
The design was built by G. William McVay's son, Bill McVay, at his company, Victoria Yachts in DeBary, Florida, United States. Production ran from 1977 until 1983, with about 600 examples of the design completed, but it is now out of production.

Design
The Victoria 18 is a recreational keelboat, built predominantly of fiberglass, with wood trim. It has a fractional sloop rig with tapered anodized aluminum spars. The hull has a spooned raked stem; a raised counter, angled transom; a keel-hung rudder controlled by a tiller and a fixed long keel. It displaces  and carries  of ballast.

The design has sleeping accommodation for two people, plus a cooler. A cockpit boom tent was a factory option. Ventilation is provided by four opening ports. For stowage the design has a lazarette.

For sailing the design is equipped with a cockpit  in length, genoa tracks, winches and jib roller reefing. For racing additional equipment allowed under the class rules can include an adjustable backstay, a boom vang, barber haulers and a spinnaker. The boat is usually raced with a crew of 1-3 sailors.

See also
List of sailing boat types

References

Keelboats
1970s sailboat type designs
Sailing yachts
Trailer sailers
Sailboat type designs by G. William McVay
Sailboat types built by Victoria Yachts